Harold R. Tyler Jr. (May 14, 1922 – May 25, 2005) was a United States district judge of the United States District Court for the Southern District of New York.

Education and career

Born in Utica, New York, Tyler received an Artium Baccalaureus degree from Princeton University in 1943, and served as a captain in the United States Army during World War II. He then received a Bachelor of Laws from Columbia Law School in 1949, entering private practice in New York City from 1949 to 1951. He was again a captain in the United States Army from 1951 to 1952. He was an Assistant United States Attorney of the Southern District of New York from 1953 to 1955, returning to private practice in New York City from 1955 to 1959. He was a United States Assistant Attorney General for civil rights from 1960 to 1961. He was in private practice in New York City in 1961.

Federal judicial service

On May 17, 1962, Tyler was nominated by President John F. Kennedy to a new seat on the United States District Court for the Southern District of New York created by 75 Stat. 80. He was confirmed by the United States Senate on August 1, 1962, and received his commission on August 2, 1962. He was a board member of the Federal Judicial Center from 1968 to 1972. Tyler resigned from the federal bench on April 6, 1975.

Tyler was Attorney General Elliot Richardson's first choice to lead the Watergate Special Prosecution Force, but he declined.

Post judicial service and death

Tyler served as a Deputy United States Attorney General from 1975 to 1977, thereafter returning to private practice in New York City until his death. He died on May 25, 2005, outside his apartment in Manhattan.

References

Sources

External links
 

1922 births
2005 deaths
Columbia Law School alumni
Judges of the United States District Court for the Southern District of New York
Princeton University alumni
United States Army officers
United States district court judges appointed by John F. Kennedy
20th-century American judges
Assistant United States Attorneys
United States Assistant Attorneys General for the Civil Rights Division
United States Army personnel of World War II